Carl Birger Bergling (1 February 1903 – 21 May 1973) was a Swedish scenographer and costume designer at the Royal Swedish Opera.

References
Search: Birger Bergling The website of the Royal Swedish Opera
Birger Bergling on Swedish Media Database

Notes 

Scenographers
Scenic designers
Swedish costume designers
1903 births
1973 deaths